Tastuba (Taźtübä) is a rural locality (a selo) in Voznesensky Selsoviet, Duvansky District, Bashkortostan, Russia. The population was 1,148 as of 2010. There are 9 streets.

Geography 
Tastuba is located 37 km northwest of Mesyagutovo (the district's administrative centre) by road. Voznesenka is the nearest rural locality.

References 

Rural localities in Duvansky District
Ufa Governorate